"Throw Some D's" is the first single from the self-titled album of rap artist Rich Boy, and his most commercially successful song to date. The single was produced by Butta and Polow da Don (who has a featured credit in the song). The song contains samples from the 1979 song "I Call Your Name" by the R&B group Switch. It has been certified platinum by the RIAA. The song was number 37 on Rolling Stones list of the 100 Best Songs of 2007.

Music video
The music video was released in October 2006 and was in heavy rotation on BET and MTV, with a cameo made by Keri Hilson.

Remixes
 The official remix was produced by Lil' Jon and it features André 3000, Jim Jones, Nelly, Murphy Lee, and The Game. It is the last track of the album.
 Kanye West released a remix of the song, including a separate interlude off his mixtape Can't Tell Me Nothing: The Official Mixtape. A music video was released via West's website.
 A rock remix to the original version was produced by Travis Barker.
 There is also another remix that features Rick Ross, The Game, Lil Wayne & Juelz Santana.
 Chicago Rap Artist Jake D! released a remix in 2006 called "Throe Sum Cheez" which on MTV's Rob & Big was used by Christopher "Big Black" Boykin in the "Mississippi" Episode.
 G-Unit member Lloyd Banks released a song called "On My Hip" which also uses the beat of "Throw Some D's".
 Papoose released a song called "Got My Ratchet Back" to the beat of "Throw Some D's".
 Lil Wayne released a song called "Put Some Keys On That" off his mixtape Da Drought 3. 
 Hell Rell released a song called "Throw Some Keys" to the beat of "Throw Some D's".
 OCDJ made a remix of "Throw some D's" called "Pls Stp Th Hstl - Pt 1" in around or before 2007. 
 Soulja Boy Tell 'Em sampled the vocals from "Throw Some D's" in his song "Report Card" off his debut studio album Souljaboytellem.com.
 Expensive Taste in collaboration with DJ Skee released a song called "Them OG's" also known as "Them Are G's On That Bitch" to the beat of "Throw Some D's".
 Charles Hamilton released a remix called "Throw Some Pink".
 Sampled on Girl Talk's 2008 album, Feed the Animals on the track "Shut The Club Down".
 DJ Whoo Kid and Young Buck released a remix to the beat of "Throw Some D's" called "Blow Some Weed" on the mixtape entitled G-Unit Radio 24: The Clean Up Man.
 A-Trak included a remix on his Dirty South Dance release.
 LA beatmaker Samiyam, played an unreleased and unofficial remix at his liveshows.
 Electronic pop group Teengirl Fantasy sampled vocals from "Throw Some D's" in their song "Portofino", which appeared as a bonus track on their album 7AM.
 Underground trap music artist VESTIGE remixed "Throw Some D's" and released it on SoundCloud.
 Alternative rap/rock group Chronic Future Future often performed "Throw Some D's" at concerts during the late years of their tenure.
Underground, incognito artist Tripp St remixed "Throw Some D's". The song, which debuted in his "Welcome to Tripp St" mix, has the original song undergo a heavy bass transformation.

Chart performance 
The single charted on the U.S. Billboard Hot 100 and peaked at number 6 in March 2007. The track saw greater success within the Hot R&B/Hip-Hop Songs and Hot Rap Tracks charts, peaking at number 3 and 2 respectively.

Weekly charts

Year-end charts

References

2007 songs
2007 debut singles
Rich Boy songs
Interscope Records singles
Song recordings produced by Polow da Don
Songs written by Polow da Don
Songs about cars